Jacob Dyneley Beam (March 24, 1908 – August 16, 1993) was an American diplomat.

Life and career
Beam was born in Princeton, New Jersey. His father was a German professor at Princeton University, and the younger Beam earned a bachelor's degree in 1929 from Princeton before he joined the US Foreign Service.

His first assignment was in Geneva, where he monitored the League of Nations and served as vice counsel in Geneva from 1931 to 1934. He then moved to Berlin and served as third secretary to the US embassy from 1934 to 1940. During World War II, he served as second secretary of the embassy in London. He returned to Germany after the war.

Beam was counselor to the US embassy in Indonesia from 1949 to 1951 and to Yugoslavia from 1951 to 1952. He became the ambassador to Poland from 1957 to 1961. From 1966 to 1969 he served as Ambassador to Czechoslovakia, where he was present at the Prague Spring. He was ambassador to the Soviet Union from 1969 to 1973.

Beam's support of Senator Edmund Muskie's visit to Moscow in January 1971 caused President Richard Nixon to remark at a meeting with Henry Kissinger and HR Haldeman to give Beam three more months in the role as Ambassador to Moscow and then fire him. 

Beam died in Rockville, Maryland, of a stroke. His son is journalist Alex Beam.

References

External links
Jacob Dyneley Beam (1908–1993), Office of the Historian
Jacob D. Beam paper at the Seeley G. Mudd Manuscript Library, Princeton University
Oral History Interview with Jacob D. Beam via Truman Library
JACOB BEAM: OUR MAN IN MOSCOW by Central Intelligence Agency

1908 births
1993 deaths
Kent School alumni
Princeton University alumni
Ambassadors of the United States to Czechoslovakia
Ambassadors of the United States to Poland
Ambassadors of the United States to the Soviet Union
20th-century American diplomats
United States Foreign Service personnel